Madawaska River may refer to:

Madawaska River (Ontario) in Eastern Ontario
 Little Madawaska River (Ontario) in Ontario which flows into the Petawawa River
Madawaska River (Saint John River tributary) in northwestern New Brunswick and eastern Quebec
Little Madawaska River (Maine) in northeastern Maine which flows into the Aroostook River

See also 
 Madawaska (disambiguation)